The discography of BNK48 consists of nine singles and three studio albums. The major singles have title tracks that are sung by a selection of the BNK48 members, called senbatsu ("selection"). The songs are covers of the Japanese songs originally recorded by AKB48, the sister group of BNK48, with the Japanese lyrics translated into Thai. And it's the original song with permission from Vernalossom.

Studio albums

 River (2018)
 Jabaja (2019)
 Warota People (2020)

Singles

Special Singles

Theaters Song

Unit 
Mimigumo (Music, Kaimook, Jaa)
VYRA (Fond, Jennis, New, Niky, Pun)

Project 
Indy Camp (Stang, Panda, Wee) From BNK48. (Fortune, Marmink, Pepo) From CGM48
Charaline (Kaew, Tarwaan, Namneung, Noey, Orn)

Videography

Own music videos

With others

Music video appearances

Filmography

Films

Television shows

Drama

Concerts

Bibliography

Senbatsu General Election Books

Photo books

Other books

Commercials and endorsements

References

Discography
Pop music group discographies
Discographies of Thai artists